Yevhen Shakhov may refer to:
Yevhen Shakhov (footballer, born 1962), Soviet and Ukrainian football player and coach, father of the man born 1990
Yevhen Shakhov (footballer, born 1990), Ukrainian footballer, son of the man born 1962